Nandhi may refer to:
 Nandi (mythology) or Nandhi, the white bull on which Lord Shiva rides
 Nandhi (2002 film), a Kannada film
 Nandhi (2011 film), a Tamil film